The 2015 Campeonato Paraense de Futebol was the 103rd edition of Pará's top professional football league. The competition began in November 9, 2014 and ended on May 3, 2015. Remo won the championship by the 44th time.

Format
In the First Stage, 10 clubs are divided into two groups (A1 and A2) and play each other once each. The top two advance to the next phase (semi-finals) and qualify for the Second Stage (Main Stage).

In the Main Stage (first round) the clubs play each other within their group, with two from each group qualifying for the semi-finals of the first round. In the second round the clubs play against clubs from the other group, with two from each group qualifying for the semi-finals of the second round. If each stage has a separate winner there will be a match between the winners of each round to see who will be the champion.

The champion, the runner-up and the 3rd-placed team qualify to the 2016 Copa Verde and 2016 Copa do Brasil. The best team who isn't on Campeonato Brasileiro Série A, Série B or Série C qualifies to Série D.

Participating teams

First stage

Second stage

First stage

Group A1

Group A2

Semifinals

Finals

Second stage

Taça Cidade de Belém

Group A1

Results

Group A2

Results

Semifinals

Final

Independente won the Taça Cidade de Belém.

Taça Estado do Pará

Group A1

Group A2

Results

Semifinals

Final

Remo won the Taça Estado do Pará.

Final

References

Pará
Campeonato Paraense